David Strassman (born September 6, 1957) is an American ventriloquist, stand-up comedian, actor, voice artist, and comedian. He is best known for his ventriloquism act with Chuck Wood and Ted E. Bare.

Early life and education
Strassman, the second of four children, was born and raised in Los Angeles County, California. His father, Harvey D. Strassman (September 19, 1922 – January 30, 2011), was a psychiatrist and medical academic.

Career
A visit to Disneyland with his family prompted a young Strassman to ask his father to purchase some professional magic tricks that he performed for local neighborhood children. Strassman took a ventriloquism class in junior high school as an elective, taught by local Chicago children's television host Steve Hart. Strassman discovered he was good at it and could make money from his performances.

Strassman studied acting at the American Academy of Dramatic Arts in New York but returned to ventriloquism, busking in Central Park in New York, Leicester Square and the Marble Arch in London, and a brief stint in Paris.

Strassman performed in New York's comedy clubs, including the Improv. In 1980, Strassman (along with his main ventriloquist character Chuck Wood) appeared in Roger Corman's horror movie Humanoids from the Deep.

In 1986, Strassman added remote control to his puppet, Chuck Wood, using transmitters, motors, and servos, from his hobby flying remote control model airplanes. He discovered a remote clutch system in a NASA facility that could be integrated into his own dummies. At the end of Strassman's act, he gets into an argument with his dummy, Chuck Wood, and leaves the stage. Chuck then appears to come to life with Strassman speaking into an off-stage microphone. He debuted this routine on The Late Show with Arsenio Hall in 1989. New York ventriloquist Stanley Burns, used remote-controlled dummies in the 1950s.

In 1995, he performed on The Jerry Lewis MDA Labor Day Telethon.

In 1996, he performed at the Edinburgh Fringe Festival in Scotland. He received the “Critics Award for Comedy” and the Glasgow “Herald Angel award.” Strassman continues to perform frequently throughout Australia, New Zealand, and Britain.

Strassman had a television talk show called "Strassman" on Nine Australia, where his puppet character, Chuck Wood, interviewed celebrities. Subsequent series were produced in England on ITV, and in New Zealand on TV2.

Strassman has 6 DVD titles. Strassman Live (1999) – Volume 1, The Chuck You Tour (2003) - Volume 2, Get Chuck'd Tour (2007) – Volume 3, Ted E's Farewell (2010) – Volume 4, Careful What You Wish For (2014) – Volume 5, and iTedE (2018) – Volume 6.

In 2010, he performed the play, "Duality," written and directed by Steve Altman, at the Edinburgh Fringe Festival and in Los Angeles, CA. Duality is a two-character play about a mentally-ill ventriloquist, Jack, who talks to himself through a puppet named Zack. Throughout Duality, Strassman's character "talks" to his ventriloquist puppet as it sits lifeless in a chair, he operates it manually with his hand in the back, and controls the puppet through wireless robotics.

Strassman regularly visits children's hospitals with his characters while on tour, including hospitals in Wellington and Melbourne.

Strassman's show, Careful What you Wish For ran in Australia through April 2014.

Characters

Puppet characters voiced by Strassman include:

 Chuck Wood - A 1950s era-looking wooden ventriloquist puppet whose character makes rude and crude jokes, fun of other characters, spits and vomits. Can also be remotely controlled. For the latter half of Careful What You Wish For, an alternate universe version of the character is presented as Charlie and sports a shaved, tattooed head and goatee, a look which carried over to Chuck in the sixth special, iTedE.
 Ted E. Bare - A soft Teddy bear hand puppet whose character is naïve, inquisitive, slow, innocent and is often the butt of Chuck's jokes and pranks. For the latter half of Careful What You Wish For, an alternate universe version of the character is presented as Theodore Bare, who smokes cigars and headbutts Strassman several times.
 Sid Beaverman - is a North American beaver whose character is an aspiring stand-up hack comic. For the latter half of Careful What You Wish For, an alternate universe version of the character is presented as Sidney Australia Wellington, a koala.
 Kevin - An Alien puppet made of foam latex and controlled manually by Strassman.  Similar in appearance to Crazy Frog
 Grandpa Fred - Ted E. Bare's grandfather who has dementia. During the latter half of Careful What You Wish For, an alternate universe version of the character is presented as Grandpa Frieda, a transgender old bear.
 A.N.G.E.L - Strassman's first female puppet, A.N.G.E.L is a robot android. A special mechanism is required to make Strassman's voice sound female.
 Buttons the Clown - A manually operated clown ventriloquist puppet who appears drunk.
 Little Ricky - A baby puppet that acts extremely nice to David. In earlier performances, Little Ricky was portrayed as David's nephew.
 The Dinosaurs - Strassman's robotic dinosaur puppets who sing pre-recorded songs.
 Vinny - A dolphin who is also a private investigator who has a bad relationship with his family.

Strassman's non-puppet characters include:
 The Crows - Strassman's robotic puppets who are aspiring musicians and when commanded to begin can't seem to stop sneezing or belching. They have also been substituted by a trio of dinosaurs who actually sing.
 Mr. Invisible - An auditioner for Teddy's replacement. Dave requires his stage hand to put on what would be assumed as a complex puppet. In fact, the segment was made up entirely of Dave talking to his hand (Chuck: Strassman's finally lost it, Strassman's finally lost it). Dave accidentally frustrates him by asking, "Do you have any special talents?" This prompted him to say, "...I'm invisible."
 Guido the Teddy Impersonator - A sleazy character who looks almost exactly the same as Teddy, but with a misshapen head. He was apparently put in jail for impersonating Teddy (and other crimes, such as drugs and prostitution). He also attempted to replace Teddy when he tried to leave the show.
 Charley - Though not actually a puppet, Charley is the commercially available programmable robot, Robonova, from Hitec. Dave brought out Charley, a small toy puppet, just for kicks while the auditions were taking place. At first Dave pretends to shoot Charley and he reacts in the expected way and other such cheap tricks. Chuck then instructed him to do several difficult tasks (stand on one leg and act like a chicken, do a cartwheel, do a handstand), which he accomplished with ease. Chuck, as it turns out, hacked Strassman's computer to made Charley do that. His final instruction: Kill the Audience. Dave scoffs at the idea when he is forced to get rid of the approaching robot.
 Mumbles - Another potential replacement for Teddy. Strassman was quite happy to give him a shot, but realized that he forgot to make him a mouth and had to fail him.

Television shows and appearances
Lifestyles with Regis Philbin
Evening at the Improv
Strassman (England ITV)
BBC Royal Variety Show
The Late Late Show (Ireland)
Strassman (Australia)
Good Morning Australia (Australia Ch. 10)
Hey Hey It's Saturday (Australia Ch. 9)
Today Tonight (Australia Ch. 7)
Strassman (New Zealand TV2)

Filmography
Humanoids from the Deep

Australia and New Zealand radio appearances
ABC Radio with Ben Elton
3AW Radio
4BC
More FM
MIX 106.3 fm Canberra

References

External links
 Official site
 Strassman's Website, Puppetronics
 David Strassman's site
 
 "One & One" (musical), Internet off-Broadway Database

1957 births
Living people
Ventriloquists
American stand-up comedians
American puppeteers
American street performers
New Trier High School alumni
Puppet designers
American male film actors
American male television actors
American people of Russian-Jewish descent
Male actors from Los Angeles
Comedians from California
20th-century American comedians
21st-century American comedians
Comedians from Illinois